Vasile Anghel (22 November 1937 – 12 September 2014) was a Romanian footballer who played as a forward.

Club career
Vasile Anghel was born on 22 November 1937 in Buzău, Romania and he started to play football at junior level in 1950 at local club, Locomotiva CFR. In 1954, he ended with junior period at Voința București, afterwards starting his senior career at Divizia B club, Progresul București. He went to play for Dinamo București where he made his Divizia A debut on 11 April 1956 in a derby against CCA București  which ended with a 4–0 loss. He played in the first European match of a Romanian team in the 1956–57 European Cup in the 3–1 victory against Galatasaray, helping The Red Dogs go to the next phase of the competition where they were eliminated by CDNA Sofia, appearing in a total of 3 games from the campaign. Anghel scored one goal in a 4–0 victory against CSM Baia Mare in the 1959 Cupa României final, helping Dinamo win the first Cupa României trophy in the club's history. In the 1961–62 Divizia A, he played 5 games as Dinamo won the title and in the following season the club won another title with Anghel playing three games in the first half, being transferred at Petrolul Ploiești for the second half where he won the 1962–63 Cupa României. Anghel made his last Divizia A appearance, playing for The Yellow Wolves on 9 June 1963 in a 2–0 away loss against Știința Timișoara, having a total of 92 matches and 16 goals scored in the competition, also he has 4 appearances in the European Cup and one in the Inter-Cities Fairs Cup. After he ended his playing career at Metalul Buzău, Anghel worked as Dinamo București's president from 1980 until 1988, a period in which the club won three league titles, two cups and reached the European Cup semi-finals in the 1983–84 edition, also he worked as a technical director at Petrolul Ploiești from 1988 until 1989 and Rapid București from 1989 until 1990. Vasile Anghel died on 12 September 2014, aged 76 in Bucharest after suffering a heart attack.

International career
Vasile Anghel played four games at international level for Romania, making his debut on 1 June 1957 under coach Gheorghe Popescu I in a friendly which ended 1–1 against Soviet Union. His following games were a 2–1 away victory against Greece and a 1–1 against Yugoslavia at the 1958 World Cup qualifiers, his last appearance taking part on 26 April 1959 in a 2–0 away loss against Turkey at the 1960 European Nations' Cup qualifiers.

Honours
Dinamo București
Divizia A: 1961–62, 1962–63
Cupa României: 1958–59
Petrolul Ploiești
Cupa României: 1962–63

Notes

References

External links
Vasile Anghel at Labtof.ro

1937 births
2014 deaths
Romanian footballers
Romania international footballers
Association football forwards
Liga I players
Liga II players
FC Progresul București players
FC Dinamo București players
FC Petrolul Ploiești players
Romanian sports executives and administrators
People from Buzău